The 1986–87 Georgia Bulldogs basketball team represented the University of Georgia as a member of the Southeastern Conference during the 1986–87 NCAA men's basketball season. The team was led by head coach Hugh Durham, and played their home games at Stegeman Coliseum in Athens, Georgia. The Bulldogs finished third in the SEC regular season standings, and received an at-large bid to the NCAA tournament as No. 8 seed in the West region. They were defeated by No. 9 seed Kansas State, 82–79 in OT, in the opening round to finish the season at 18–12 (10–8 SEC).

Roster

Schedule and results

|-
!colspan=9 style=| Non-conference Regular season

|-
!colspan=9 style=| SEC Regular season

|-
!colspan=9 style=| SEC Tournament

|-
!colspan=9 style=| NCAA Tournament

References

Georgia Bulldogs basketball seasons
Georgia
Georgia
Georgia Bulldogs
Georgia Bulldogs